İbrahim Serdar Aydın (born 19 July 1996) is a Turkish professional footballer who plays as a midfielder for Beyoğlu Yeni Çarşı. He made his Süper Lig debut on 13 April 2014.

References

External links
 
 
 
 
 

1996 births
People from Bakırköy
Footballers from Istanbul
Living people
Turkish footballers
Turkey youth international footballers
Association football midfielders
Fenerbahçe S.K. footballers
Kardemir Karabükspor footballers
Bursaspor footballers
1922 Konyaspor footballers
Bayrampaşaspor footballers
Süper Lig players
TFF Second League players
TFF Third League players